Jennifer Harrison (born 1955) is a contemporary Australian poet. She is a recipient of the Christopher Brennan Award.

Born in Liverpool, Sydney, Harrison studied medicine and then specialised in psychiatry. Since her first volume of poetry, Michelangelo's Prisoners in 1994, she has published several more, winning the 1995 Anne Elder Award and being short-listed for the 2000 Kenneth Slessor Prize for Poetry. In 2011 she won the Christopher Brennan Award for lifetime achievement in poetry. Her photography has been exhibited at the National Gallery of Victoria.

Having lived in the United States and New Zealand, Harrison resides in Melbourne and is employed as a child psychiatrist. She is also a photographer. She is The Dax Poetry Collection Manager for the Dax Centre at the University of Melbourne.

Works
Poetry
 Michelangelo's Prisoners. (Black Pepper publishing, 1994) 
 Mosaics & Mirrors: Composite poems. (Black Pepper publishing, 1995) 
 Cabramatta/Cudmirrah. (Black Pepper publishing, 1996) 
 Dear B. (Black Pepper publishing, 1998) 
 Folly & Grief. (Black Pepper publishing, 2006)   REVIEW REVIEW
 Colombine, New & Selected Poems. (Black Pepper publishing, 2010) 
Edited
 With Phil Ilton, Said the Rat!. (Black Pepper publishing, 2003) 
 With Kate Waterhouse, Motherlode; Australian Women's Poetry 1986-2008. (Puncher & Wattmann, 2009)

References

External links
 Jennifer Harrison Biography at Black Pepper publishing

1955 births
Living people
Australian poets
Australian psychiatrists
Collection managers
Writers from Sydney
Psychiatrists from Melbourne
Australian women poets
Australian women psychiatrists